The two-stage 2016 MLS Re-Entry Draft took place on December 16, 2016 (Stage 1) and December 22, 2016 (Stage 2). All 22 Major League Soccer clubs were eligible to participate. The priority order for the Re-Entry Draft was reverse order of finish in 2016, taking into account playoff performance. The two 2017 expansion teams, Atlanta United FC  and Minnesota United FC, had selections 21 and 22, respectively.
 
Available to all teams in Stage 1 of the Re-Entry draft were:
 Players who were at least 23-years-old and had a minimum of three MLS service years whose options were not exercised by their clubs (available at option salary for 2017).
 Players who were at least 25-years-old with a minimum of four years of MLS experience who were out of contract and whose club did not wish to re-sign them at their previous salary (available for at least their 2016 salary).

Players who were not selected in Stage 1 of the Re-Entry Draft were made available in Stage 2. Clubs selecting players in Stage 2 were able to negotiate a new salary with the player. Players who remained unselected after Stage 2 were made available to any MLS club on a first-come, first-served basis.

Teams also had the option of passing on their selection.

Available players
Players were required to meet age and service requirements to participate as stipulated by the terms of the MLS Collective Bargaining Agreement. The league released a list of all players available for the Re-Entry Draft on December 16, 2016.

Stage One
The first stage of the 2016 MLS Re-Entry Draft took place on December 16, 2016.

Round 1

Round 2

Stage Two
The second stage of the 2016 MLS Re-Entry Draft took place on December 22, 2016.

Round 1

Round 2

References

Categories 

Major League Soccer drafts
Mls Re-entry Draft, 2016
MLS Re-Entry Draft